Colonel Charles Lynch  (1736 – 1796) was an American planter, politician, military officer and judge who headed a kangaroo court in Virginia to punish Loyalists during the Revolutionary War. The terms "lynching" and "lynch law" are believed to be derived from his surname.

Early life

He was born in 1736 at an estate known as Chestnut Hill on the banks of the James River in Virginia, a place at which his brother, John Lynch, would later establish the town of Lynchburg. Lynch's father left his native Ireland and emigrated to the British colony of Virginia in about 1725 as an indentured servant, called a "redemptioner" in the nomenclature of the day. Upon arrival to the New World, Lynch's contract of indenture was sold to a wealthy planter living in Caroline County. Lynch remained with the planter for his fixed term of servitude, winning in the process not only his freedom but also the hand of the planter's daughter, Sarah Clark, in marriage. 

With the financial assistance of the elder Clark, the Lynches themselves became planters of tobacco on a large scale, farming well over 7,000 acres of Virginia land. Sometime between Charles' birth in 1736 and the middle of the decade, Charles' father died, leaving behind his Chestnut Hill estate to his eldest son, John. His mother joined the Quaker religious sect in 1750, bringing her sons with her into that religion. Lynch married a fellow Quaker, the former Anne Terrell, on January 12, 1755. With Chestnut Hill occupied by his brother, the young couple set out to establish their new home on Virginia's western frontier on a more distant parcel of land granted to his father by King George II, in the newly established Bedford County. 

Green Level, the Lynch estate where the couple would ultimately raise five children, was located at a place now marked by the town of Altavista. Lynch was instrumental in organizing a Quaker meeting in Bedford County and raising funds for a building to house it, the first public house of worship in the area. Lynch served for several years as the clerk of the meeting and as trustee of the group's meeting house. He was also a delegate to the Quaker Assembly in Virginia. Following the end of the French and Indian War in 1763, the danger associated with life at the frontier greatly lessened, and a flood of newcomers began to appear in Bedford County. 

His position as a landowner and leading citizen was now well-established. His farming of tobacco and raising of cattle had made him a wealthy man, the possessor of property which included several slaves. Beginning in 1764 other citizens began to approach Lynch to ask him to become a candidate for the Virginia Assembly. Lynch initially refused the entreaties on the grounds that swearing the necessary oath of office was prohibited behavior for an adherent of the Quaker religion.

Career

In 1767, Charles became a justice of the peace of Bedford County, Virginia but was disowned by the Quakers for taking an oath of office, something they were not permitted to do. Lynch served in the Virginia House of Burgesses and the Convention from 1769 until 1778, when he became a militia colonel. After the Revolution, he served in the Virginia Senate from 1784 to 1789. In several incidents in 1780, Lynch and several other militia officers and justices of the peace rounded up suspects who were thought to be a part of a Loyalist uprising in southwestern Virginia. The suspects were given a summary trial at an informal court; sentences handed down included whipping, property seizure, coerced pledges of allegiance, and conscription into the military. Lynch's extralegal actions were legitimized by the Virginia General Assembly in 1782.

"Lynch's Law," referring to organized but unauthorized punishment of criminals, became a common phrase, as it was used by Lynch to describe his actions as early as 1782. The Oxford English Dictionary, however, notes, "The origin of the expression has not been determined." Variations of the term, such as "lynch law," "judge lynch," and "lynching", were standard entries in American and British English dictionaries by the 1850s. In 1811, a man named Captain William Lynch claimed that the phrase, already famous, actually came from a 1780 compact signed by him and his neighbors in Pittsylvania County, Virginia, to uphold their own brand of law independent of legal authority. The obscurity of the Pittsylvania County compact compared to the well-known actions of Charles Lynch casts doubt on it being the source of the phrase.

See also
 Lynching in the United States

Footnotes

Further reading
 Thomas Walker Page, "The Real Judge Lynch", The Atlantic Monthly, vol. 88, whole no. 530 (December 1901), pp. 731–743.
 Brent Tarter, "Charles Lynch", American National Biography Online, February 2000.
 Fralin, Gordon Godfrey, "Charles Lynch, originator of the term Lynch law (1955)" Master's Theses. Paper 102.

External links
 "Avoca's History," Avoca Museum website, Altavista, Virginia — Museum established in a home on the former estate of Charles Lynch.

1736 births
1796 deaths
People disowned by the Quakers
House of Burgesses members
People from Bedford County, Virginia
People from Altavista, Virginia
American vigilantes
Virginia militiamen in the American Revolution
Virginia state court judges
Virginia state senators
American people of Irish descent
American planters
American slave owners
18th-century American politicians